Blazing Frontier is a 1943 American Western film directed by Sam Newfield. The film is also known as Blazing Range (American recut version).

Cast 
Buster Crabbe as Billy the Kid
Al St. John as Fuzzy Q. Jones
Marjorie Manners as Helen Barstow
Milton Kibbee as Clem Barstow
I. Stanford Jolley as Luther Sharp
Frank Hagney as Sheriff Ward Tragg
Kermit Maynard as Deputy Pete
George Chesebro as Deputy Slade
Frank Ellis as Deputy Biff

See also
The "Billy the Kid" films starring Buster Crabbe: 
 Billy the Kid Wanted (1941)
 Billy the Kid's Round-Up (1941)
 Billy the Kid Trapped (1942)
 Billy the Kid's Smoking Guns (1942)
 Law and Order (1942) 
 Sheriff of Sage Valley (1942) 
 The Mysterious Rider (1942)
 The Kid Rides Again (1943)
 Fugitive of the Plains (1943)
 Western Cyclone (1943)
 Cattle Stampede (1943)
 The Renegade (1943)
 Blazing Frontier (1943)
 Devil Riders (1943)
 Frontier Outlaws (1944)
 Valley of Vengeance (1944)
 The Drifter (1944) 
 Fuzzy Settles Down (1944)
 Rustlers' Hideout (1944)
 Wild Horse Phantom (1944)
 Oath of Vengeance (1944)
 His Brother's Ghost (1945) 
 Thundering Gunslingers (1945)
 Shadows of Death (1945)
 Gangster's Den (1945)
 Stagecoach Outlaws (1945)
 Border Badmen (1945)
 Fighting Bill Carson (1945)
 Prairie Rustlers (1945) 
 Lightning Raiders (1945)
 Terrors on Horseback (1946)
 Gentlemen with Guns (1946)
 Ghost of Hidden Valley (1946)
 Prairie Badmen (1946)
 Overland Riders (1946)
 Outlaws of the Plains (1946)

External links 

1943 films
1943 Western (genre) films
American black-and-white films
Billy the Kid (film series)
Producers Releasing Corporation films
American Western (genre) films
1940s English-language films
Films directed by Sam Newfield
1940s American films